Uur Caleed is an area in Somalia, situated between Kalabayr and Iskushuban, and covers 2/3 of the bari region in Somalia.

Major towns in Uur Caleed
 Ufeyn – The Capital
 Kobdhexaad
 Jeedaal
 Tisjiic
 Geesaqabad 
 Moqor
 Tuula Mirood
 Dawacaley
 Kalabayr
 Xinka

Education in Uur Caleed

 SH. Abdalla Ibrahim Secondary School.
 Thirteen (13) Primary And Intermediate Schools Include (Godane, Kobdhexaad, Daalrul-Cilmi, Jeedaal, Tisjiic, Ugaas Yasin Primary & Intermediate, Moqor,Iftin primary &intermediate gesaqabad etc.)
 Institute Of Language Studies 
 Vocational Schools
 Computer Training Institutions 
 Institute Of Health Science 
 Islamic Studies Institution

Water supply in Uur Caleed

Two water pipelines have been rehabilitated to serve 25,000 residents of Ufeyn District in Bari Region. Tisjiic water pipelines were also rehabilitated and pipeline which flows to lower section of Tisjiic had been installed, tisjiic has an ever-flowing water streams like many other places in the area including Ufayn District.  Water access points such as boreholes, shallow wells, and hand taps are being constructed. Water sources include (Ufeyn hoose, Ufeyn sare, Tisjiic, Tisjiic sare, digaley, dibir, jidmoxor, and so on).

Sites
Sites in Uur Caleed:

References

Bari, Somalia
Populated places in Bari, Somalia